Death Is the Only Mortal is the sixth studio album by American metalcore band The Acacia Strain. It was released on October 9, 2012. It is the band's first release on Rise Records and their final album with Daniel "DL" Laskiewicz as their guitarist before leaving the band in May 2013. The opening track, “Doomblade”, contains a sample from the 2012 horror film, The Devil Inside.

The first single, "Victims of the Cave", was released on September 6, 2012. The second single, "The Mouth of the River", was released on September 24, 2012.

Track listing

Personnel
Vincent Bennett - lead vocals
Daniel "DL" Laskiewicz - guitars, programming, bass, backing vocals, production 
Kevin Boutot - drums

Production
Produced, Engineered & mixed by Daniel «DL» Laskiewicz, January – July 2012, @ DLR Studios, Chicopee / Stillwork Studios, Holyoke, Massachusetts
Mastered by Joey Sturgis, @ The Foundation Recording Studio, Connersville, Indiana
Drum engineering by Daniel «DL» Laskiewicz & Benjamin Jon
Additional guitar by Antonio Diaz
Management by Leah Urbano & Scott Lee (Crimson Management)
Art direction, Design & illustration by Justin Kamerer (angryblue.com)

References

The Acacia Strain albums
2012 albums